Wide Sargasso Sea is a 1993 Australian film directed by John Duigan and starring Karina Lombard and Nathaniel Parker. It is an adaptation of Jean Rhys's 1966 novel of the same name.

Premise
The novel and film explore Jean Rhys's account of the West Indian Creole heiress, here called Antoinette Cosway, who marries the Englishman Mr. Rochester from Jane Eyre, and becomes his "madwoman in the attic" featured in the novel Jane Eyre by Charlotte Brontë. For a full-length summary see: plot summary of Wide Sargasso Sea.

Cast
 Karina Lombard – Antoinette Cosway
 Nathaniel Parker – Edward Rochester
 Rachel Ward – Annette Cosway
 Michael York – Paul Mason
 Martine Beswick – Aunt Cora
 Claudia Robinson – Christophene
 Huw Christie Williams – Richard Mason
 Casey Berna – Young Antoinette Cosway
 Rowena King – Amelie
 Ben Thomas – Daniel Cosway
 Naomi Watts – Fanny Grey

Release
Fine Line Features released the film for the United States market. The film was given a restrictive NC-17 rating due to its sexual content. Fine Line opted not to pursue a less restrictive, more marketable R rating.

Production
The screenplay was written by Australian director John Duigan, producer Jan Sharp, and Carole Angier, a Rhys biographer.

John Duigan later said he did not enjoy the experience of making this film:
It was probably the only really unsatisfying interaction that I've had with a production company and I found that I had major disagreements with them and with the producers. It was unfortunate. Jan Sharp, the producer of the film, had the tenacity to get the film made, but she and I had differences of opinion. She was very well informed on the book, and I'm sure her opinions were arguable, as I like to think mine were, but when you have a situation like that, I think the overall project can suffer. I think the film did suffer from that division.

Reception
Before release in the United States, the film was caught up in changing classification rules for films. Largely because it contained full frontal male nudity, as well as erotic content, it was classified as NC-17, which limited the number of theaters that would carry it. It received a largely favorable review by critic Vincent Canby of the New York Times. He describes the lean Gothic romance film as "romantic" but "without soft edges. It is as cool, precise and hard as the Rhys prose." Canby also notes that the casting of Karina Lombard, who is half-Lakota, adds an unstated racial dimension that is not part of the novel.

Wide Sargasso Sea grossed $45,806 at the box office in Australia.

See also
Cinema of Australia
Wide Sargasso Sea (TV)

References

External links
 
 
 Review at JaneEyre.net

1993 films
Films based on British novels
Films set in the 1840s
Films set in Jamaica
Films shot in Jamaica
Australian erotic drama films
1990s English-language films
Films directed by John Duigan
Works based on Jane Eyre
1990s erotic drama films
Films scored by Stewart Copeland
1993 drama films